Lady Franklin Point is a landform in the Canadian Arctic territory of Nunavut. It is located on southwestern Victoria Island in the Coronation Gulf by Austin Bay at the eastern entrance of Dolphin and Union Strait.

The Point is uninhabited but still had an active North Warning System. Originally part of the Distant Early Warning Line in the Northwest Territories, the site is known as PIN-3. On 10 January 2000 the unmanned site caught fire and was almost totally destroyed.

Named after Jane Griffin, Lady Franklin, it was the historical area of Nagyuktogmiut, a Copper Inuit subgroup.

Climate

References

Peninsulas of Kitikmeot Region
Headlands of Kitikmeot Region
Victoria Island (Canada)
Former populated places in the Kitikmeot Region